The March of the Kings or The March of the Wise Men (in French La Marche des rois or La marche des Rois mages, in Provençal La Marcho di Rèi) is a popular Christmas carol of provençal origin celebrating the Epiphany and the Wise Men. The notoriety of the theme spread outside Provence when Georges Bizet used it in his Arlésienne.

History

Origin and attributions 
The precise origins of both the tune and the lyrics are uncertain and debated.

The lyrics are regularly attributed to Joseph-François Domergue, (born in 1691, died on April 2, 1728, in Avignon), priest-dean of Aramon, in the Gard, from 1724 to 1728, whose name appears on the first manuscript copy of the lyrics, dated 1742 and preserved in the library of Avignon.

The text was published in Paris in 1759 in the Recueil de cantiques spirituels provençaux et françois gravés par le Sieur Hue. Subsequently, the work was added to the various (expanded) editions of the Provençal Christmas collection by the poet and composer of the seventeenth century Nicolas Saboly (1614-1675), to which it has often, and erroneously, been attributed.

According to the 1742 document, the text can be sung on the tune of a Marche de Turenne ("March of Turenne"). This mention corresponds to the established practice of christmasists consisting of placing their texts on "known" French songs spread by the printing press. One hypothesis is that this Marche de Turenne would be a military march dating back to the 17th century, in honor of the victories of Marshal Turenne, Such a "Marche de Turenne" has however not been found. Some authors wanted to attribute it to Lully, although no document corroborates this attribution.

An Avignon tradition rather dates the Marche de Turenne back to the fifteenth century, at the time of King René (1409-1480), while some authors from the late nineteenth century and the beginning of the twentieth leaned towards a reference to Raymond de Turenne (1352-1413), known as The Scourge of Provence, grand-nephew of Pope Clement VI and nephew of Pope Gregory XI.

In the 21st century, several American scholars think that the March of the Kings has a medieval origin dating back to the 13th century. It could then be one of the oldest Christmas carols listed with Veni redemptor gentium and one of the first entirely composed in vernacular, and not in Latin.

According to research carried out by the scholar Stéphen d'Arve (Edmond de Catelin) at the end of the nineteenth century, the only known score is that of Étienne-Paul Charbonnier (1793-1872), organist at the Aix Cathedral, who, perhaps taking it from the chain of its predecessors, had reconstructed it from memory by modifying its orchestration as new instruments were introduced. Henri Maréchal, an inspector of the Conservatoires de France having done research at the request of Frédéric Mistral, thought, for his part, that "La Marcha dei Rèis" must have been composed by Abbé Domergue himself.

Epiphany Celebration
Every year, the Epiphany feast gives rise in certain towns and villages of Provence to popular parades, the "Marches des Rois", where citizens sumptuously dressed as Biblical Magi progress towards the local church to the sound of the  March and other traditional music, accompanied by inhabitants dressed according to local folklore. Particularly at Aix-en-Provence , from the beginning of the nineteenth century, a sumptuous popular ceremony celebrates the visit of the kings: a traditional procession of characters dressed in Provençal costumes (shepherds, horsemen, drummers, trades, etc.) accompanies the Magi and their camels to Saint-Sauveur Cathedral where the organist, accompanied by drummers, performs the air of the "March of the Kings" at the arrival of the procession, passing from "pianissimo" to "fortissimo" to evoke the approach of the procession. A large star is then lit on the main altar, symbolizing the star that guided the Magi to Bethlehem. The ceremony ends as the tune plays descrescendo when the Kings leave.

Joseph d'Ortigue wrote in 1837:

Covers and adaptations

The March of the Kings is one of the themes of the overture of l'Arlésienne (1872 ), incidental music composed by Georges Bizet for a drama on a Provençal subject by Alphonse Daudet. According to musicologist Joseph Clamon, Bizet could find the melody of this march in a book published in 1864. After the failure of the drama, Bizet drew from the incidental music a suite for orchestra (Suite n° 1) which was an immediate success. In 1879, four years after the composer's death, his friend Ernest Guiraud produced a second suite (Suite n° 2) in which the March of the Kings is repeated in canon in the last part of the revised work.

Certain passages are also found in the operetta Gillette de Narbonne by Edmond Audran, created in 1882. The words of a song "M'sieu d'Turenne", which can be sung to the tune of the March of the Kings, are due to :fr:Léon Durocher (1862-1918).

The March of the Kings has become a traditional chanson de France and one of the most common Christmas carols in the repertoire of French-speaking choirs. It has been performed several times by performers such as Tino Rossi, :fr:Les Quatre Barbus, Marie-Michèle Desrosiers or, in English, Robert Merrill. The piece has been adapted many times, notably by the organist Pierre Cochereau through an improvised toccata in 1973 for the Suite à la française sur des thèmes populaires.

Lyrics
The words of Abbé Domergue's original poem mention a 
traveler who observes a sumptuous convoy accompanying three Kings surrounded by guards who protect their gold, without the traditional incense and myrrh being mentioned. While following the star, the Kings praise God with such beautiful voices that the traveler accompanies them on their journey which ends in front of the Christ-child.

Notes and references 

Christmas carols
Epiphany (holiday)
Compositions for organ